The 2016 European Weightlifting Championships were held in Førde, Norway from 10 April to 16 April 2016.

Schedule

Medal overview

Men

Women

Results

Men's 56 kg

Men's 62 kg

Men's 69 kg

Men's 77 kg

Men's 85 kg

Men's 94 kg

Men's 105 kg

Men's +105 kg

Women's 48 kg

Women's 53 kg

Women's 58 kg

Women's 63 kg

Women's 69 kg

Women's 75 kg

Women's +75 kg

Medals tables

Results including snatch and clean & jerk medals

Total results

Participating countries
List of participating countries. In total, 340 (144 female, 196 male) athletes from 40 countries participated in this championships.

External links
Official website
IWF results

European Weightlifting Championships
International weightlifting competitions hosted by Norway
2016 in Norwegian sport
Førde
European
Weightlifting
April 2016 sports events in Europe